The Ambassador Extraordinary and Plenipotentiary of Ukraine to the  People's Republic of China is the ambassador of Ukraine to China. The current ambassador is Oleh Dyomin. He assumed the position in 2013. 

The first Ukrainian ambassador to China assumed his post in 1993, the same year a Ukrainian embassy opened in Beijing.

List of representatives
 1993–1998 Anatoly Plyushko
 1998–1999 Pavlo Sultansky (provisional)
 1999–2001 Ihor Lytvyn
 2001–2003 Mykhailo Reznik
 2004–2009 Serhii Kamyshev
 2009–2012 Yurii V. Kostenko
 2012–2013 Vasyl Hamyanin (provisional)
 2013–2019Oleh Dyomin
 2019–2021Serhii Kamyshev

See also 
 Ukrainian Embassy, Beijing
 Embassy of China, Kyiv
 China-Ukraine relations
 Foreign relations of China
 Foreign relations of Ukraine
 List of diplomatic missions in Ukraine
 List of diplomatic missions of China

References

External links 
  Embassy of Ukraine to China

 
China
Ukraine